Homedale is a suburb of Wainuiomata, part of Lower Hutt city situated in the lower North Island of New Zealand.

Demographics

Homedale had a population of 5,694 at the 2018 New Zealand census, an increase of 345 people (6.4%) since the 2013 census, and an increase of 123 people (2.2%) since the 2006 census. There were 1,947 households. There were 2,829 males and 2,865 females, giving a sex ratio of 0.99 males per female, with 1,236 people (21.7%) aged under 15 years, 1,245 (21.9%) aged 15 to 29, 2,529 (44.4%) aged 30 to 64, and 687 (12.1%) aged 65 or older.

Ethnicities were 71.7% European/Pākehā, 29.0% Māori, 14.9% Pacific peoples, 6.0% Asian, and 2.1% other ethnicities (totals add to more than 100% since people could identify with multiple ethnicities).

The proportion of people born overseas was 16.4%, compared with 27.1% nationally.

Although some people objected to giving their religion, 50.2% had no religion, 36.6% were Christian, 1.2% were Hindu, 0.2% were Muslim, 0.6% were Buddhist and 3.3% had other religions.

Of those at least 15 years old, 519 (11.6%) people had a bachelor or higher degree, and 981 (22.0%) people had no formal qualifications. The employment status of those at least 15 was that 2,394 (53.7%) people were employed full-time, 546 (12.2%) were part-time, and 237 (5.3%) were unemployed.

Education
Wainuiomata Primary School is a state contributing primary (Year 1–6) school in Homedale, and has  students as of  It was established in 1857 and merged with Wood Hatton School in 2002.

References

Suburbs of Lower Hutt